The Jubilee Handicap was a motor race staged at the Phillip Island circuit in Victoria, Australia on 6 May 1935. The race, which was organised by the Victorian Sporting Car Club, was contested on a handicap basis over a distance of 100 miles. 

The race was won by H. Abbott driving an Austin Brooklands. Abbott, who was the "limit man", started the race 18 minutes before "scratch" starters J. Pockett (Ford V8) and Barney Dentry (Riley) His winning margin over second placed L. Burrows (Terraplane) was one second with third placed C. Pickworth (Terraplane) a further 27 seconds behind.

Entries
There were fifteen entries for the race.

Note: Handicaps as published with the race report in The Argus on 7 May differ in some cases from those published with the list of entries in The Argus on 29 April.

Race results

Details of the other eight starters have not yet been ascertained.

Race statistics
 Number of entries: 15
 Number of starters: 14
 Limit starter: H. Abbott (Austin Brooklands)
 Scratch starters: J. Pockett (Ford V8) & Barney Dentry (Riley)
 Fastest Lap: Barney Dentry (Riley), 5m 10s (76.25 mph)
 Fastest Time: Barney Dentry (Riley), 1h 18m 40s

References

External links
 Motor Races at Cowes - Preliminary Trials, The Argus, Monday 6 May 1935, page 15, as archived at trove.nla.gov.au 
 N.S.W. Driver Wins Victorian Scratch Motor Race, The Advertiser, Tuesday, 7 May 1935, page 18, as archived at trove.nla.gov.au

Jubilee Handicap
Motorsport at Phillip Island